"Lady" is a song written by Johnny Cash and originally recorded by him for his 1977 album The Rambler.

Released in the summer of 1977 as a single (Columbia 3-10587, with "Hit the Road and Go" on the B-side), the song reached number 46 on U.S. Billboard country chart for the week of September 17.

Track listing

Charts

References

External links 
 "Lady" on the Johnny Cash official website

Johnny Cash songs
1977 songs
1977 singles
Songs written by Johnny Cash
Columbia Records singles